"Talkin' to the Wrong Man" is a song written and recorded by American country music artist Michael Martin Murphey as a duet with his son Ryan Murphey.  It was released in February 1988 as the second single from Murphey's album River of Time.  The song reached number 4 on the Billboard Hot Country Singles chart in July 1988 and number 1 on the RPM Country Tracks chart in Canada.

Charts

Weekly charts

Year-end charts

References

1988 singles
Michael Martin Murphey songs
Male vocal duets
Songs written by Michael Martin Murphey
Warner Records singles
1988 songs